Angel Rat is the sixth studio album released by Canadian heavy metal band Voivod. Produced by Terry Brown of Rush fame, it was released in 1991 by Mechanic/MCA Records and is the follow-up to their critically acclaimed release, 1989's Nothingface. On this album, Voivod adopted a more alternative/progressive/psychedelic rock sound, as opposed to the progressive metal of Nothingface and the thrash metal of previous releases. A music video was made for the song "Clouds in My House".

While Angel Rat was released on a major record label, the album initially received mixed reviews and was not as successful as Nothingface, though it has since gained a strong cult following. Before the release of the album, bassist Jean-Yves Thériault (Blacky) departed from the group, but rejoined in 2008 (he would later leave again in 2014).

Men Without Hats bandleader Ivan Doroschuk performs keyboards on "The Outcast". This was done in return for drummer Michel Langevin recording the drums for Men Without Hats' album Sideways, recorded around the same time, and participating in the tour to promote that album.

The master tapes for the album, as well as Nothingface and The Outer Limits, were long thought destroyed in the 2008 Universal Studios fire, however Thériault discovered in late 2019 that the tapes were located in a facility in Pennsylvania, after persistently questioning Universal staff. The tapes are now in his possession.

Track listing 
All songs written by Voivod

Personnel
Voivod
 Denis Bélanger – vocals
 Denis D'Amour – guitar, keyboards
 Michel Langevin – drums, cover concept
 Jean-Yves Thériault – bass guitar, keyboards

Additional musicians
 Ray Coburn – keyboards
 Ivan Doroschuk – additional keyboards on track 9

Production
Terry Brown – producer, engineer, mixing
John Bailey, L. Stu Young – assistant engineers
Pierre Jasmin – computer programming
Kiisti Matsuo – lyrical consultant
Steve Sinclair – executive producer

References 

1991 albums
Voivod (band) albums
MCA Records albums
Albums produced by Terry Brown (record producer)
Albums recorded at Metalworks Studios